Houlahan is a surname. Notable people with the surname include:

Chrissy Houlahan (born 1967), American politician, engineer, and entrepreneur
Ger Houlahan, Irish Gaelic footballer
Harry Houlahan (born 1930), English footballer

See also
8407 Houlahan, a main-belt asteroid
Houlihan